Çiğli railway station is a railway station in İzmir, Turkey. The station is within the Çiğli district of the city and is a stop for all trains on the line. İZBAN operates commuter trains north to Aliağa and Menemen and south to Alsancak and Tepeköy. TCDD Taşımacılık operates seven trains, five intercity and two regional, to Eskişehir, Bandırma, Balıkesir, Soma, Uşak and Alaşehir. 

Çiğli was the northern terminus of the Çiğli suburban for 140 years, since the service began in 1865 until it ended in 2005.

References

 

Railway stations in İzmir Province
Railway stations opened in 1865
1865 establishments in the Ottoman Empire
Çiğli District